Li Hongquan (born September 9, 1969, in Dongshan, Zhangzhou, Fujian) is a male Chinese sports sailor. He competed for Team China at the 2008 Summer Olympics.

Major performances
1993 National Games - 1st flying Dutchman class;
1997/2001 National Games - 1st Finn class

References
 http://2008teamchina.olympic.cn/index.php/personview/personsen/1794

1969 births
Living people
Chinese male sailors (sport)
Olympic sailors of China
Sportspeople from Zhangzhou
Sailors at the 2008 Summer Olympics – Star
Sportspeople from Fujian